Dallas High School is a public high school in Dallas, Oregon, United States.

Academics
Dallas High School's state report card was ranked Satisfactory.

In 2011, 51% of the school's seniors received a traditional high school diploma. Of 240 students, 123 graduated on time, 45 dropped out, and 65 were still in high school the following year, or were participating in the Extended Campus program through Chemeketa Community College.

Athletics
In 2012, in what was known in Dallas as "The Year of the Dragon", the dance team, the Dragonfire Dancers, won first place in the 5A Small division at State. The wrestlers took first at state in Oregon's 5A division.

In 1987, the Dallas Dragons won their first and only state championship in football when they beat Sweet Home.

Notable alumni
Evelyn Sibley Lampman, American writer
Connie Munk. Nevada politician
Edgar Oehler, Swiss politician

References

High schools in Polk County, Oregon
Dallas, Oregon
Public high schools in Oregon